In Croatia, a name day is a day corresponding to a date in the Catholic calendar when the respective saint's day is celebrated. Even though celebration of the name day is less usual than celebrating birthday, the name day is more often congratulated by broader number of acquaintances. This is because the date of birth is seldom known and the person's name is known to many.

The names that are celebrated on the certain saint's day are all the names that correspond to the respective name and all the derivative names. If there are different version of the same name in different languages (e.g. John, which in Croatian is Ivan and in Spanish is Juan)  all the respective names are celebrated. Sometimes both sexes are celebrated for the same saint (usually male). For example, November 30 is the day of Saint Andrew apostle, and both Andrija (male) and Andreja (female) are celebrated.

When several saints share the same name, imendan calendars will show all of them. However, it is customary to celebrate only one of them, typically the most famous.

See also General Roman Calendar and Tridentine Calendar.

Names attributed to a certain saint link to the wikiarticle about the saint.

January 

 Marija, Reljefima
 Bazilije, Grgur
 Isusovo, Genoveva, Cvijeta
 Sdislava
 Emilijana, Radoslav, Miljenko
 Gašpar 
 Rajmund, Lucijan, Zorislav
 Severin, Bogoljub, Apolinarij
 Julijan, Živko, Miodrag
 Agaton, Dobroslav, Aldo
 Honorat, Neven
 Arkadije, Živana, Ernest
 Hilarije, Veselko, Radovan
 Felik, Srećko
 Franjo 
 Marcel, Oton, Mislav
 Antun, Lavoslav, Vojmil
 Marg., Priska
 Mario, Ljiljana, Marta
 Fabijan, Sebastijan
 Agneza, Janja, Neža
 Vinko, Irena
 Emerencijana, Ema, Vjera, Milko
 Franjo, Bogoslav
 Ananija
 Timotej, Tit, Paula, Tonka
 Angela, Vitalijan, Pribislav
 Toma, Tomislav
 Vilana, Valerije, Konstancije
 Martina, Tina, Gordana
 Ivan, Marcela, Julije

February 

 Brigita, Gita, Miroslav
 Marijan
 Blaž, Vlaho, Tripun
 Katarina, Andrija, Veronika
 Agata, Dobrila, Jagoda
 Pavao, Doroteja, Dora
 Pio, Rikard, Držislav
 Jeronim, Jerko 
 Apolonija, Zora, Sunčica
 Alojzije, Skolastika, Rastija Luzer
 Lurdska
 Reginald, Damjan, Eulalija
 Jordan, Božidar, Božica
 Valentin, Valentina, Zdravko
 Klaudije
 Onezim, Julijana, Miljenko
 Donat
 Angelico, Šimun, Flavijan, Gizela
 Konrad, Ratko, Blago
 Lav, Lea
 Petar, Damir, Eleonora
 Grozdan
 Polikarp, Romana
 , Goran, Modest, Ranko
 (no name)
 Aleksandar, Alka, Sandra, Branimir
 Gabriel, Donat
 Roman, Teofil, Bogoljub
 (no name)

March

 Čista, Albin, Zoran
 Ines, Čedomil, Iskra
 Anzelmo, Marin, Kamilo
 Kazimir, Eugen, Natko 
 Euzebije, Vedran
 Koleta, Zvjezdana, Viktor
 Perpetua, Felicita, Ardo
 Pačista, Ivan od Boga
 Franciska, Franjka
 Emilijan, Emil, Krunoslav
 Firmil, Trvtko
 Bernard, Budislav, Maksimilijan
 Rozalija, Ratka, Kristina m.
 Matilda, Miljana, Borka
 Bezimena, Longin
 Hrvoje, Miljan
 Patrik, Domagoj, Hrvatin
 Ćiril Jeruzalemski, Cvjetan
 Josip, Joso, Joško
 Klaudija, Dionizije, Vladislav
 Kristijan, Vesna, Vlasta
 Sredoposna, Oktav
 Oton, Dražen
 Katarina, Simeon
 Blagovijest
  i Maksima, Emanuel
 Ivan Damašć., Rupert, Lidija, Lada
 Priska, Sonja, Polion
 Gluha, Jona, Bertold
 Kvirin, Viktor, Krescent, Bosiljka
 Benjamin, Amos, Ljubomir

April

 Hugo, Teodora
 Franjo, Dragoljub
 Rikard, Svevlad, Benedikt
 Izidor b., Dora, Strahimir
 CVIJETNICA
 Vilim, Rajko
 Ivan de la Salle, Herman, Epifan
 Dionizije, Alemka
 Marija Kleofina, Demetrije
 Ezekijel
 Stanislav, Stana, Radmila
 Julije, Viktor, Davorka
 Uskrsni ponedjeljak, Martin I., Ida
 Valerijan, Maksim
 Krescent, Bosiljka, Anastazija
 Josip Benedikt Labre, Bernardica
 Rudolf, Robert
 Eleuterija, Amadej
 Konrad, Ema, Rastislav
 Janja from Montepulciano, Marcijan
 Anzelmo, Goran
 Soter i Kajo, Vojmil
 Sv. Juraj, Juro, Ðuro, Ðurdica
 Fidelis m., Vjeran, Vjerko, Vjera
 Sv. Marko ap. i ev., Maroje
 Kleto i Marcelin, Višnja
 Ozana Kotorska, Jakov Zadranin
 Petar Chanel, Ljudevit m. Grignon
 Katarina Sijenska
 Pio V. papa, Josip Cottolengo

May

 Josip
 Anastazije, Eugen, Boris
 Filip i Jakov ap., Jakica
 Florijan, Cvjetko, Cvijeta
 Vinko Fererski, Maksim, Andenlko
 Dominik Savio, Nedjeljko, Benedikta
 Dujam, Duje, Duška, Gizela kr.
 Marija posrednica, Marina, Ida
 Herman, Mirna, Beato, Kristofor
 Ivan Merz, Gospa Trsat.
 Mamerto
 Leopold Mandic
 Gospa Fatimska, Servacije, Ena
 Matija ap., Mate, Matko, Matea
 Solinski mucenici, Sofija
 Ivan Nepomuk, Andrija Bobola, Nenad
 Paskal, Paško
 Ivan I. papa, Venancije, Srecko
 Celestin V. p., Rajko, Teofil, Inka
 Bernardin Sijenski
 UZAŠAŠCE GOSP., SPASOVO
 Renata, Rita, Jelena, Jagoda, Milan
 Deziderije, Željko, Želimir, Vilim
 Marija Pom., Prijenos sv. Dom.
 Beda Casni, Grgur VII., papa
 Filip Neri, Zdenko, Eleuterij
 Augustin Canterburyjski
 German
 Polion i Euzebije, Veceslav
 Ivana Arška
 DUHOVI, Pohod BDM, MB Kam. vrata

June

 Marija, Justin, Malden
 Marcelin i Petar, bl. Sadok, Eugen
 Karlo Lwanga i dr.
 Kvirin Sisacki, Petar from Verona, Predrag
 Bonifacije, Valerija, Darinka
 Nobert, Neda, Klaudije, Berto
 Robert
 Bl. Dijana i Cecilija, Medardo, Vilim
 Efrem, Ranko
 Margareta, Dijana, bl. Ivan Dominici
 Barnaba ap., Borna
 Ivan Fakundo, Bosiljko, Nino
 Antun Padovanski,  Ante, Tonci, Toni
 Rufin, Elizej, Zlatko
 Vid, Modest
 Franjo Regis 
 Laura, Nevenka, Adolf
 Marko i Marcelijan, Ljubomir
 Presveto Srce Isusovo, Romualdo
 Bezgrešno Srce Marijino, Naum Ohrid.
 Alojzije Gonzaga
 Ivan Fisher, Toma More
 Josip Caffasso, Sidonija, Zdenka
 Rodenje Ivana Krstitelja
 Vilim, Nora
 Ivan i Pavao, Vigilije, Zoran
 Ladislav kralj, Ciril Aleksandrijski
 Irenej, Smiljan
 Petar i Pavao, ap., Krešimir
 Rimski prvomucenici, Kajo

July

 Estera
 Oton, Višnja, Ostoja
 Toma apostol, Tomislav, Tomo, Miki
 Elizabeta Portugalska kr., Elza, Berta
 Ciril i Metod, Slaven
 Marija Goretti
 Vilibald, Vilko, Klaudija
 Akvila i Priscila
 Marija Petkovic, Ivan from Cologne i muc.
 Amalija, Alma, Ljubica, Ljuba
 Benedikt opat, Olga, Oliver
 Mislav, Tanja, Suzana
 MAJKA BOŽJA BISTRICKA
 Kamilo de Lellis, Miroslav
 Bonaventura
 Gospa Karmelska, Karmela
 Bl. Ceslav Poljak, Branko, Dunja
 Fridrik, Dalibor, Arnold, Natko
 Justa i Rufina, Zlatka
 Ilija prorok, Ilijana
 Danijel prorok, Lovro Brindiški, Danica
 Marija Magdalena
 Brigita Švedska, Ivan Cassian, Slobodan
 Kristina Bols., Mirjana
 Jakov st. ap., Kristofor, Kristo
 Joakim i Ana, Rod. BDM
 Klement Ohridski, Natalija m.
 Nazarije i Celzo mm., 
 Marta, Blaženka
 Petar Krizolog, Rufin, Anda
 Ignacije Loyolski, Vatroslav, Ognjen

August

Alfons, Vjera, Nada
 Gospa od Andela
 Bl. Augustin Kažotic, Lidija
 Ivan M. Vianney, Ivica, Tertulijan
 Gospa Snježna, Snježana, Nives
 Preobraženje Gospodinovo
 Siksto II. p., Kajetan, Albert, Donat b.
 Dominik, Nedjeljko, Dinko
 Edith Stein, Tvrtko
 Lovro dakon, Laura
 Klara Asiška, Jasna, Jasminka
 Anicet, Ena
 Poncijan i Hipolit, Ivan Berchmans
 Maksimilijan Kolbe, Alfred
 Marija, Velika
 Rok, Stjepan kralj
 Hijacint Poljak, Slobodan
 Jelena Križarica, bl. Manes
 Ivan Eudes
 Bernard cn., Branko, Dino
 Pio X. p., Hermogen, Anastazij
 BD Marija Kraljica, Regina, Vladislava
 Ruža Limska, Filip
 Bartol ap., Bariša, Zlata
 Ljudevit IX., Josip Kalasancijski, Patricija
 Aleksandar
 Monika, Honorat, Caslav
 Augustin, Tin, Gustav
 Glavosijek Ivana Krstitelja, Sabina R.
 Feliks, Radoslava
 Rajmund, Rajko, Paulin

September

 Egidije, Branimir, Branislav, Tamara
 Kalista, Divna
 Grgur Veliki, Grga, Mansvet
 Ruža Viterpska, Dunja, Ida
 Bl. Majka Terezija, Lovro Just., Roman
 Zakarija pr., Davor
 Marko Krizin
 Mala Gospa, Marica, Maja, Alen
 Petar Klaver
 Nikola Tolentino, Pulherija, Lijepa
 Hijacint, Cvjetko, Miljenko
 Ime Marijino, Marija
 Ivan Zlatousti, Ljubo
 Uzvišenje sv. Križa, Višeslav
 Žalosna Gospa, Dolores
 Kornelije i Cipirijan
 Robert Belarmin, Rane sv. Franje
 Ivan Macias, J. Kupert., Irena
 Januarije, Emilija
 Andrija Kim i dr.
 Matej ap., Mate, Matko
 Toma Vil., Mauricije
 Padre Pio, Lino p., Tekla
 Gospa od otkupljenja, Mercedes
 Nikola of Flue, Aurelija, Kleofa, Firmin
 Kuzma i Damjan, Damir
 Vinko Paulski, Gaj
 Dominik Ibanez i jap. muc., Vjenceslav
 Mihovil, Rafael, Gabrijel, arkandeli
 Jeronim, Jerko

October

Tereza, Terezija
Andelko, Anda
 Kandid, Maksimilijan, Evald
 Franjo Asiški
 Rajmund of Capua, Flavijan, Miodrag
 Bruno, Fides, Verica, Vjera
 Kraljica Svete Krunice
 Šimun, Zvonimir
 Ljudevit Bertran, Dionizije, Ivan Leon
 Franjo Borgija,  Danijel, Danko
 Emilijan, Bruno K.
 Serafin, Makso, Edvin
 Edvard kr., Edo, Teofil
 Kalist I., papa mucenik
 Terezija Avilska, Tereza, Zlata
 Margareta Marija Alacoque
 Ignacije Antiohijski, Vatroslav, Ognjen
 Luka ev., Trifonija
 Pavao od Križa
 Vendelin, Irena, Miroslava
 Uršula, Hilarija
 Marija Saloma, Dražen, Cedomil
 Ivan Kapistran, Borislav, Severin
 Antun M. Claret,  Jaroslav
 Katarina Kotromanic
 Demetrije Sr., Zvonimir
 Sabina Avil., Gordana, Cvitko
 Šimun i Juda Tadej apaostoli
 Narcis, Stojko, Darko, Ida
 Marcel, Marojko, Lukan, German
 Alfonz Rodriquez, Vuk, Vukmir

November

 Svetislav, Sveto
 Dušica, Duško
 Martin de Porres, Hubert
 Karlo Boromejski, Dragutin, Drago
 Emerik, Mirko, Srijemski mucenici
 Leonard pust., Vedran, Sever
 Engelbert, Andelko
 Gracija Kotorski, Milotislav, Bogdan
 Ivan Lateranski
 Leon Veliki papa, Lavoslav, Lav
 Martin biskup
 Jozafat K., Milan, Renato
 Stanislav Kostka, Brcko b., Stanko
 Nikola Tavelic, Ivan Trogirski
 Albert Veliki, Leopold
 Margareta Škotska kr.
 Elizabeta Ugarska, Igor, Grgur
 Posveta Bazilike sv. Petra i Pavla
 Janja Asiška, Matilda, Krispin
 Feliks Valois, Srecko, Edmund
 Prikazanje BDM, Gospa od Zdravlja
 Cecilija, Filemon
 Klement R., Milivoj
 Sveti Vijet. muc., Krizogon, Krševan
 Katarina Aleksandrijska
 Konrad, Leonardo, Dubravko
 Virgilije, Severin, Velimir
 Jakov, Markijski, Katarina Laboure
 Saturnin, Svjetlana
 Andrija, Andreja

December

Eligije, Božena
Bibijana, Blanka
Franjo, Klaudije, Lucije
 Ivan Damašcanski, Barbara
 Saba opat., Krispina, Sabina
 Nikola bikup, Nikša
 Ambrozije, bl. Marin from Kotor
 Bezgrešno začeče BDM
 Valerija, Zdravka
 Gospa Loretska, Julija, Judita
 Damaz I., Barsaba, Damir
 Ivana Franciska Ch.
 Lucija, Jasna, Svjetlana
 Ivan od Križa, Krševan
 Irenej, Drinske mucenice
 Adela kr., Albina, Zorka
 Lazar, Izak, Jolanda, Florijan
 Gacijan, Bosiljko, Rufo, Dražen
 Urban V. papa, Vladimir, Božica, Tea
 Eugen, Makarije, Amon
 Petar Kanizije, Perica
 Honorat, Caslav, Zenon
 Ivan Kentijski, Viktorija
 Adam i Eva
 Christmas (Božić), hence Božidar, Božo, Natalija, Nataša
 Stjepan Prvomucenik, Krunoslav
 Ivan ev., Ivo, Janko
 Mladen, Nevenka
 Toma Becket, David, Davor
 Feliks I., papa; Sabin
 Silvestar, Silvestrovo, Zahvalnica

Notes

References

External links
Croatian Catholic calendar

Croatia
Croatia-related lists